"Wonderland by Night" (German title "Wunderland bei Nacht") is a popular song by Bert Kaempfert that was a Billboard number one hit for three weeks, starting January 9, 1961. It was recorded in July 1959.  The song was written by Klaus Günter Neumann with English lyrics by Lincoln Chase. It was Bert Kaempfert's first hit with his orchestra. The song featured Charly Tabor on trumpet. "Wonderland by Night" also crossed over to the R&B chart where it peaked at number five.

Chart history

All-time charts

Notable cover versions
Another cover, recorded and released by Louis Prima, also charted in the same year, reaching #15 on the Billboard charts. 
Anita Bryant's version, which included orchestrations by Lew Douglas, reached #18 on the US Pop Chart.

In popular culture 
A German-language numbers station (G10) was operated by one of Polish intelligence agencies and was active until the late 1970s which used Keampfert's version of the song and its b-side repeated twice followed by the average format of a numbers station. it was later replaced by G11, which was most recently active from 2007 to 2014.

See also
List of Billboard Hot 100 number-one singles of 1961

References

Songs about nights
1960 singles
1961 singles
Billboard Hot 100 number-one singles
Cashbox number-one singles
Anita Bryant songs
Decca Records singles
1960 songs
1960s instrumentals
Number-one singles in New Zealand
Songs written by Lincoln Chase